The 2009 Trani Cup was a professional tennis tournament played on outdoor red clay courts. It was the seventh edition of the tournament which was part of the 2009 ATP Challenger Tour. It took place in Trani, Italy between 17 and 23 August 2009.

Singles entrants

Seeds

 Rankings are as of August 10, 2009.

Other entrants
The following players received wildcards into the singles main draw:
  Carlos Berlocq
  Daniele Bracciali
  Flavio Cipolla
  Filippo Volandri

The following players received entry from the qualifying draw:
  Francesco Aldi
  Marco Crugnola
  Stefano Ianni
  Sebastian Rieschick (as a Lucky Loser)
  Matteo Trevisan

Champions

Singles

 Daniel Köllerer def.  Filippo Volandri, 6–3, 7–5

Doubles

 Jamie Delgado /  Jamie Murray def.  Simon Greul /  Alessandro Motti, 3–6, 6–4, [12–10]

External links
ITF Search 

Trani Cup
Clay court tennis tournaments
Trani Cup